Khuean Phak is a tambon (subdistrict) of Phrao District, in Chiang Mai Province, Thailand. In 2020 it had a total population of 4,627 people.

Administration

Central administration
The tambon is subdivided into 10 administrative villages (muban).

Local administration
The whole area of the subdistrict is covered by the subdistrict administrative organization (SAO) Khuean Phak (องค์การบริหารส่วนตำบลเขื่อนผาก).

References

External links
Thaitambon.com on Khuean Phak

Tambon of Chiang Mai province
Populated places in Chiang Mai province